Dimension X may refer to:
Dimension X (radio program) a US radio drama that ran from 1950 to 1951
Dimension X (video game) 1984 Atari 8-bit family game from Synapse Software
Dimension X (Teenage Mutant Ninja Turtles), a location in the Teenage Mutant Ninja Turtles franchise